was the 15th and last official headmaster or sōke of Kashima Shinden Jikishinkage-ryū, a (koryū) of the Japanese martial art of swordsmanship (kenjutsu). He was a student of the 14th sōke, Sakakibara Kenkichi (榊原 鍵吉).

In the early twentieth century (1927), he published a book documenting all five classical kata of this koryū that originates from the sixteenth century.

See also
 Kashima Shinden Jikishinkage-ryū

References

External links 
 Kashima Shinden Jikishinkage-ryū

Japanese swordfighters
1859 births
1930 deaths